The Profound Inner Principles also known as Profound Inner Meaning or 'Zabmo Nangdon' is a 14th century treatise  and major work of Rangjung Dorje (1284–1339), the third Karmapa, born to a Nyingma family he received the full transmission of the Nyingma tradition, in addition to the Karma Kagyu.

Nomenclature, orthography and etymology

'Rangjung Dorje'

Exegesis
Rangjung Dorje was a noted scholar who composed many significant texts, the most famous of which is  the Profound Inner Meaning (Wylie: zab mo nang don), which concern the Vajrayana inner yoga practices.

Translation 
The text and its commentary by Jamgon Kongtrul Lodro Thaye has been translated in English by Elizabeth M. Callahan. It was published in 2013 by Shambhala Publications.

Structure

Summary
The first chapter covers the 'causes' (Sanskrit: hetu) and 'conditions' (Sanskrit: pratyaya) for Samsara and Nirvana. The second chapter discusses the esoteric understanding of the development of the body in the womb which has direct relevance to the Generation stage. The text then discusses Nadis, the five 'winds' Prana/Vayu (Sanskrit) and 'breathwork' (Sanskrit: pranayama) and the 'Four States' which are stages of the Generation Phase. Correspondence between 'inner' and 'outer' which broaches nonduality and the Two truths. 'Imputed deities' which discusses the yoga of the 'illusory body', yidam and emanation bodies. 'Bases' discusses the Eighteen Dhatu and Upaya. Ten, discusses Bhumi and Lamrim. Chapter eleven closes with Completion stage.

Chapters
The Tsadra Foundation (2008) lists the following chapters in the Profound Inner Meaning, also rendered into English:

Introduction
One: The Causes and Conditions for Saṃsāra and Nirvāṇa
Two: Development of Body in Womb
Three: Nāḍīs
Four: Prāṇas
Five: Bindus
Six: The Four States
Seven: Correspondence between Inner and Outer
Eight: Imputed Deities
Nine: Bases and Means of Purification
Ten: Stages of the Path
Eleven: Dissolution
Conclusion: Vidyādhara piṭaka

Commentary
Jamgon Kongtrul did a commentary on the text which has been given the English gloss 'Illuminating the Profound Meaning: a Commentary to The Profound Inner Meaning (Zabdon Nangjey)'.

Editions
 (The Profound Inner Meaning.) Rumtek, Sikkim: Karmapa'i chos sgar, n.d.

See also
 Tibetan Buddhist canon
 Yana—a guide to the various classifications of the Buddhist schools into "yanas" or "vehicles".

Footnotes

Tibetan Buddhist treatises
1322 books